Kaye Gorenflo Hearn (born January 30, 1950) is a former justice of the South Carolina Supreme Court. She served on the court from 2010 to 2022.

Education and career 

Hearn is a graduate of Bethany College, the University of South Carolina School of Law, and the University of Virginia School of Law. Following her graduation from law school, Hearn clerked for Justice Julius B. Ness of the South Carolina Supreme Court and then practiced law in Horry County, South Carolina. Prior to her service on the Supreme Court, Hearn was elected to the South Carolina Family Court and was the chief judge of the South Carolina Court of Appeals. Hearn retired from the court on December 31, 2021.

Recognition 

Hearn also holds honorary degrees from institutions including the Charleston School of Law, Francis Marion University, and the University of South Carolina.

Personal life 

Her husband, George M. Hearn, is a former member of the legislature and a family law attorney in town.

References

1950 births
Living people
21st-century American judges
21st-century American women judges
American women lawyers
Justices of the South Carolina Supreme Court
South Carolina lawyers
South Carolina state court judges
University of South Carolina School of Law alumni
Place of birth missing (living people)